white-knuckle is an idiom that means causing fear, excitement, apprehension, suspense, or nervousness, for example, a "white-knuckle" amusement ride. 

It can also refer to:
"White Knuckle Ride", a 2010 song by British alternative group Jamiroquai
"White Knuckles", a 2010 song by alternative rock band OK Go
"White Knuckles", a related music video
Nintendo: White Knuckle Scorin', a 1991 compilation album released by Nintendo
White Knuckle, a novel by Eric Red
"A White-Knuckle Panic", an episode of  Chicago Fire
"White Knuckle", and episode of Chicago P.D.
"White Knuckle Angel Face", a song by Elijah Blue Allman
"White Knuckles", a song on the 2016 Love You to Death by Tegan and Sara